Santiam Junction State Airport  is a public airport located adjacent to Santiam Junction in Linn County, Oregon, United States. Santiam Junction is the intersection of U.S. Route 20 and Oregon Route 22. The Oregon Department of Transportation has a maintenance facility located on the north side of the field.

See also
Santiam Pass

External links

Airports in Linn County, Oregon